Glenville, also known as the Jincy P. Glenn House, is a historic house in Eutaw, Alabama. The structure was built in the mid-1840s for Jincy Pride Glenn.  She was born in Virginia in 1776.  Jincy Glenn was the widow of Daniel Glenn of Union County, South Carolina. The house was placed on the National Register of Historic Places as part of the Antebellum Homes in Eutaw Thematic Resource on April 2, 1982, due to its architectural significance.

References

National Register of Historic Places in Greene County, Alabama
Houses on the National Register of Historic Places in Alabama
Houses completed in 1840
Houses in Greene County, Alabama